2020 CPL might refer to:

2020 Caribbean Premier League, cricket competition
2020 Canadian Premier League, soccer competition